Local Color is a 2006 American drama film, written and directed by George Gallo and starring Armin Mueller-Stahl, Ray Liotta and Trevor Morgan in the lead role. It is based on a true story, that of the director/writer's experience when he was 18. The character of Nikolai Serov was based on George Cherepov, to whom Gallo had been an apprentice in the 1970s.

Plot
John Talia is a teenager who aspires to be a painter, despite the fact that his eponymous father strongly disapproves of his interest in art. Talia manages to meet Nikolai Serov, an elderly Russian expatriate impressionist painter who had been quite successful in the years before the modern art movement threw realism into disrepute.

Serov is bitter and has not painted for years. Gradually Talia attempts to befriend the elderly artist, and despite many rebuffs, finally succeeds. Serov invites the young man to spend the summer with him in his summer house in the countryside. Talia's father is extremely skeptical, and suspicious of the elder man's motives, but the young Talia goes anyway.

During the first weeks, Serov seems to be using Talia primarily as an unpaid laborer to fix up his house, however it becomes clear that the Russian is sharing with the young man many nuggets of wisdom about life and art. Eventually Serov shows him many things about how to paint, and how to capture a shared experience.

When Talia comes home at the end of the summer, unknown to the young man, Serov goes to Talia's house first, and manages to win over the young man's highly skeptical father.

Some years later, when Serov dies, he leaves many of his paintings to the young man, who happily remembers seeing Serov finally painting again.

Cast

Production
Gallo also painted all of the oil paintings in this movie, having "cleaned out his whole garage" of his paintings. In particular, the paintings that John (Trevor Morgan) showed to Serov (Armin Mueller-Stahl) when asking him for advice in the beginning of the movie were the exact paintings that Gallo as a teenager had showed Cherepov.

Although the film was based in New York and Pennsylvania, the film was actually shot in various locations in Louisiana in and around New Orleans, Covington and Baton Rouge.  Production began in July 2005. The company stayed in two different hotels to avoid delays driving from New Orleans to a nearby location at the end of the schedule and were thus able to wrap production only 8 days before Hurricane Katrina without interruption.

References

External links
 
 Official Distributor
 
 

2006 films
2006 drama films
Films directed by George Gallo
American films based on actual events
Films set in New York (state)
Films set in Pennsylvania
Films shot in Louisiana
American drama films
Films about fictional painters
2000s English-language films
2000s American films